The Lada Niva Travel is a compact crossover utility vehicle (CUV) produced since 1998 by the AvtoVAZ Group. Originally called the VAZ-2123 (1998–2002), the SUV was marketed as the Chevrolet Niva from 2003 to 2020, when AvtoVAZ (the parent company of the Lada brand) was in a joint venture with General Motors, called GM-AvtoVAZ.

However, after General Motors sold its 50-percent stake in the firm in 2020, the car was for a short time rebranded as the 'Lada Niva', giving the car then the same name that the original, 1977-launched Lada Niva/ Lada 4x4/ VAZ-2121 still has, in certain European markets — while the VAZ-2123 is also a development of its predecessor, VAZ-2121's mechanical underpinnings.
  
On 21 December 2020, the car was rebranded the 'Lada Niva Travel'.

Although the body and the interiors are all new, it is still based on the old VAZ 2121 engine, transmission and most mechanicals.

The Niva Travel rebadging featured a touched-up body, and the 1.7-litre gasoline engine has fuel injection. 

In 2003, the car was awarded zero stars out of a possible four by the Russian ARCAP safety assessment program.

An export version with reinforced hull, 1.8-litre Opel Ecotec Family 1 gasoline engine and Aisin four-wheel drive has been under consideration since 2003. Although most of the engineering work has been completed, the release has been constantly postponed. Although the GM-AvtoVAZ considered building a new engine plant for the local production of Ecotecs, in July 2005 it was announced that the project was cancelled, along with plans for the long-anticipated "export" Niva. However, the project was revived in autumn 2006 and the "Niva FAM1" was introduced as a new trim level for the 2007 model year. The price was much higher than the standard trim, that made the project not as successful and led it to be discontinued in April 2008. Another reason was the ceasing of Ecotec engine production at the Hungarian plant.


2009 Facelift and upgrade

In 2009, the model got a minor update, featuring a slight restyling, done by Bertone studio and some minor-changes. The GLS and GLC version also comes with improved safety, such as ABS and dual front airbags.

Lada takeover of production

In August 2020 Lada took over production of the Chevrolet Niva, rebranding it as the Lada Niva.

In December 2020, following a new generation of the car, the new Lada Niva was further rebranded as Lada Niva Travel, while the old Niva 4x4 was rebranded as Lada Niva Legend in January 2021.

Chevrolet Niva Concept (2014)

GM-AvtoVAZ introduced a concept vehicle for a new generation of the Chevrolet Niva at the Moscow International Automobile Salon in late August 2014. The Niva Concept, designed by Ondrej Koromház of GM (or at General Motors' headquarters in Melbourne according to other sources), had a longitudinal mounted engine, full-time four-wheel-drive, two-gear transfer case and rigid-axle rear suspension. The production model was supposed to get a 1.8-liter PSA Peugeot Citroën EC8 engine (135 hp) paired with a 5-speed manual gearbox, although more recent news reports suggested that it was planned to be based on the Renault Duster platform. The new model's production version was initially expected in 2016, but following Chevrolet stopping sales of its mainstream models in Russia, no further information has been released on the topic.

In September 2018, it was reported that GM has suspended all the work on planned replacement of Chevrolet Niva.

In August 2020 Lada took over production of the Chevrolet Niva rebranding it as the Lada Niva.

References

External links
 Official GM-Niva site (Russian)

Cars of Russia
Niva
AvtoVAZ
Off-road vehicles
All-wheel-drive vehicles
Mini sport utility vehicles
ARCAP small off-road]
Cars introduced in 1998
2000s cars
2010s cars